Doo rag may refer to:
An alternate spelling of do-rag, a simple piece of cloth tied at the back, used to cover the head
Doo Rag (band), a Lo-fi music punk/blues band from Tucson, Arizona, active in the mid-1990s
"Doo Rag", a song by Galactic from their 1998 album Coolin' Off
Slang for toilet paper